Anthony Mulvey (188211 January 1957) was an Irish nationalist politician.

Born in County Leitrim, Mulvey edited the Ulster Herald newspaper before his election to represent Fermanagh and Tyrone for the Nationalist Party in the British House of Commons at the 1935 general election.

Mulvey did not take his seat until 1945, and with Patrick Cunningham, proposed that the Nationalist Party also take an abstentionist policy with regard to the Parliament of Northern Ireland.

Mulvey held his seat at the 1945 general election, and in 1950 after the division of Fermanagh and Tyrone constituency, he was elected for Mid Ulster, one of the successor constituencies. He stood down the following year, and died aged 74 in 1957.

References

Bibliography
Michael Stenton and Stephen Lees, Who's Who of British MPs: Volume IV, 1945-1979 (Harvester, Brighton, 1979)

External links

1882 births
1957 deaths
Date of birth missing
Place of death missing
Nationalist Party (Ireland) politicians
UK MPs 1935–1945
UK MPs 1945–1950
UK MPs 1950–1951
Members of the Parliament of the United Kingdom for Fermanagh and Tyrone (1922–1950)
Members of the Parliament of the United Kingdom for Mid Ulster
Politicians from County Leitrim
People from County Leitrim
Irish newspaper editors